Mala Ivanča  is a village in the City municipality Sopot of Belgrade, Serbia. According to the 2002 census, the village has a population of 1701 people.

References

Suburbs of Belgrade
Sopot, Belgrade